Cleanflix is a documentary about CleanFlicks and the re-edited video stores and the film sanitization industry, particularly in Utah.

Themes and discussion
The film mainly talks about CleanFlicks, the re-edited DVD business, how it was started, the Mormons moral beliefs on the editing of Hollywood movies, filmmakers' stances on the idea of re-edited films, and the lawsuits between CleanFlicks and the Directors Guild of America. It also shows some of the video stores in Utah Valley that sold them and the business owners and the sexual misconduct of edited video store owner, Daniel Thompson.

Release
The film premiered at the 2009 Toronto International Film Festival. For about a year and a half, while the creators looked for a distribution company, it played at different film festivals. In 2012, they found their distributor who gave the film a limited theatrical release. Within that year, it was given a physical release on DVD and went onto streaming services such as Netflix (for three years), Amazon Prime Video, Vudu, YouTube, Hulu, and iTunes.

Reception
The review aggregation website Rotten Tomatoes reported a 71% approval rating with an average rating of 6.25/10 based on 7 reviews.

Joe Leydon of Variety said, "Pic is undeniably amusing when focused on extreme measures by self-appointed censors, but there's only a token effort made to seriously examine central questions." Peter Sciretta of SlashFilm gave the film 7.5/10 stars, and called it, "the most interesting topical documentary about movies since This [Film] Is Not Yet Rated," but criticized the shift in focus on Danny Thompson during the film. Noel Murray of The A.V. Club gave the film a rating of B, praising the showcase of Daniel Thompson's story and criticizing the repetitiveness of the central subject. Cynthia Fuchs of PopMatters gave the film 7/10 stars, and stated, "[It] doesn't pretend to resolve the many questions it asks. Instead, [it] focuses on a particular, especially fervid period for the clean movement." Merrick of Ain't It Cool News claimed, "I doubt edited-video supporters will really enjoy the film, but the rest of us should have a pretty darn good time." MetroActive.com called the film, "...a terrific tale..." The Orlando Sentinel gave the film 3/4 stars and said, "...these 'censorship' issues are still with us and as [it] points out, both sides have a point." Greig Dymond of CBC News called the film, "compelling," and said, "that [the film] deserves to find an audience beyond the festival circuit." Jimmy Martin of SLUG Magazine described the film as, "...a powerful, poignant and balanced exploration..."

Accolades

References

External links
 Information about Cleanflix on Andrew James' official website
 
 Official teaser trailer

2009 films
American documentary films
Films about censorship
2009 documentary films
Documentary films about films
Documentary films about Hollywood, Los Angeles
Documentary films about Utah
2000s English-language films
2000s American films